Richard O'Brien (born 1942) is an English actor, television presenter, writer and theatre performer.

Richard O'Brien may also refer to:

 Richard O'Brien (American actor) (1917–1983), American film and television actor
 Richard O'Brien (author) (born 1934), American writer on the subject of toys and toy collecting
 Richard O'Brien (economist) (born 1950), English economist
 Sir Richard O'Brien (industrial relations expert) (1920–2009), British industrial relations expert and British Army officer
 Richard O'Brien (Fox News) (1956–2017), American creative director who worked for Fox News
 Richard Baptist O'Brien (1809–1885), Irish Roman Catholic priest, author and advocate of Irish home rule
 Richard Barry O'Brien (1847–1918), Irish lawyer, historian, journalist and writer
 Richard Henry O'Brien (1758–1824), American privateer during the American Revolution

See also
 Richard O'Brien Three-Decker, an apartment house listed in the United States National Register of Historic Places
 Lucius Richard O'Brien (1832–1899), Canadian artist